Antonio Michael Pedroza Whitham (born 20 February 1991) is an English-Mexican professional footballer who plays as a forward.

Early life
Antonio Pedroza was born in Chester to a Mexican father and an English mother. At the age of two years, he was brought to Miguel Auza, a municipality located in the Mexican state of Zacatecas.

Prior to starting his career, he spent short trial periods with various clubs in Europe such as Premier League clubs Fulham and Arsenal, as well as Spanish La Liga club Atletico de Madrid.

Club career

Mexico
Pedroza made his league debut with Jaguares on 24 July 2010 against Necaxa, coming in as a substitute after 45' minutes.

England
In 2011, there were rumours that Pedroza could potentially join the English club Tottenham Hotspur, However, negotiations for Pedroza eventually fell through and he was left without a club because the Mexican draft had expired meaning he could not re-sign with Jaguares for the 2011–12 season.

He eventually joined south London side Crystal Palace for whom he signed a three-year contract. However, he barely saw action with the Eagles' first team in the 2011–12 season.

Return to Mexico
Pedroza decided to return to Mexico on a loan with Morelia. After his loan ended he left Palace and England and signed for Liga de Ascenso side Cruz Azul Hidalgo.

In July 2014 he signed with C.S. Herediano of the Costa Rican Primera División on a six-month loan. He was presented to media by the club the next month on 7 August.

Ecuador
In January 2018, Pedroza joined C.D. Olmedo of the Ecuadorian second tier.

Career statistics

Club
Statistics accurate as of 30 June 2013

Honours
Cruz Azul
CONCACAF Champions League: 2013–14

Herediano
Liga FPD: Clausura 2016, Apertura 2018
CONCACAF League: 2018

References

External links

1991 births
Living people
English people of Mexican descent
Mexican people of English descent
Sportspeople from Chester
Footballers from Zacatecas
English footballers
Mexican footballers
Association football forwards
Chiapas F.C. footballers
Crystal Palace F.C. players
Atlético Morelia players
C.S. Herediano footballers
Cruz Azul footballers
Deportivo Toluca F.C. players
C.D. Olmedo footballers
Mineros de Zacatecas players
Liga MX players
Ascenso MX players
English Football League players
Liga FPD players
English expatriate footballers
Mexican expatriate footballers
English expatriate sportspeople in Ecuador
Mexican expatriate sportspeople in Ecuador
Expatriate footballers in Ecuador